The 2020 Northern Iowa Panthers football team represented the University of Northern Iowa in the 2020–21 NCAA Division I FCS football season. The team was led by Mark Farley in his 20th season and played their home games in the UNI-Dome in Cedar Falls, Iowa as a member of the Missouri Valley Football Conference.

Previous season

They finished the 2019 season 8–4, 6–2 in MVFC play to finish in second place. They received an at-large bid to the FCS Playoffs where they defeated San Diego and South Dakota State to advance to the quarterfinals where they lost to James Madison.

Schedule
Northern Iowa had a game scheduled against Iowa on September 5, which was later canceled before the start of the 2020 season.

a.^ Panther Sports Network involves these channels (CFU Ch. 15/HD415; KCRG-TV Ch. 9.2; KCWI Ch. 23; KGCW Ch. 26, (NBC Sports Chicago or NBC Sports Chicago Plus)

Players drafted into the NFL

References

Northern Iowa
Northern Iowa Panthers football seasons
Northern Iowa Panthers football